The Coming China Wars: Where They Will Be Fought, How They Can Be Won is a book by Peter Navarro published by FT Press in (2006).  Navarro examines China as an emerging world power confronting challenges at home and abroad as it struggles to exert itself in the global market. He also investigates how China's role in international commerce is creating conflicts with nations around the world over energy, natural resources, the environment, intellectual property, and other issues. A review in Publishers Weekly describes the book as "comprehensive" and "contemporary" and concludes that it "will teach readers to understand the dragon, just not how to vanquish it".

References

Further reading
Business Book Review 
Peace Corps Review
Asia Times Review

External links
 Peter Navarro

2006 non-fiction books
Economics books
Economy of China
Books about China